David Adams and John-Laffnie de Jager were the defending champions but they competed with different partners that year, Adams with Andrei Olhovskiy and de Jager with Jason Weir-Smith.

Adams and Olhovskiy lost in the first round to de Jager and Weir-Smith.

de Jager and Weir-Smith lost in the semifinals to Petr Luxa and Radek Štěpánek.

Luxa and Štěpánek won in the final 5–7, 6–2, 7–6(7–5) against Jaime Oncins and Daniel Orsanic.

Seeds

  Wayne Arthurs /  Sandon Stolle (quarterfinals)
  David Rikl /  Cyril Suk (quarterfinals)
  Jaime Oncins /  Daniel Orsanic (final)
  David Adams /  Andrei Olhovskiy (first round)

Draw

External links
 2001 BMW Open Doubles Draw

2001 ATP Tour
2001 BMW Open